The A 7 road is an A-Grade trunk road in Sri Lanka. It connects Avissawella with Nuwara Eliya.

The A 7 passes through Karawanella, Yatiyanthota, Kitulgala, Ginigathena, Hatton, Talawakele and  Nanuoya to reach Nuwara Eliya.

A07 highway